Beta Vukanović (18 April 1872 – 31 October 1972), also known as Babette Bachmayer, was a Serbian painter and centenarian.

Biography
Born in Bamberg, Upper Franconia, German Empire to a Serbian family, she initially studied painting at the Kunstgewerbeschule in Munich. She also worked with Anton Ažbe. From 1898, she lived mostly in Belgrade. Her earliest works reflected the influence of plein-air painting in Munich, which changed to Impressionism before World War I. Her later style was predominantly realistic; she painted many pictures of the Serbian landscape and its people.

She originated Serbian artistic caricature  and left around 500 humorous portraits of contemporaries from the social and cultural scene in Belgrade.

Beta Vukanović died in Belgrade, aged 100.

Personal life
Her husband was an Impressionist painter, Rista Vukanović (born 3 April 1873, Bugovina, near Trebinje, Herzegovina - died 7 January 1918, Paris), recognized as one of the artists responsible for taking Serbian art into new directions. He studied at St Petersburg and Munich, later teaching at various institutions.

See also
 List of Serbian centenarians

References

External links
 Legacy
 Photo of Beta Vukanović
 YouTube channel
 Lični stavovi - Nepoželjni jer su Nemci, danas.rs; accessed 10 May 2018.

Serbian Impressionist painters
1872 births
1972 deaths
Serbian centenarians
Serbian caricaturists
Serbian women painters
20th-century women artists
Artists from Belgrade
Women centenarians